The  took place in 1582, near Kyoto, Japan, following the Battle of Yamazaki. 

The forces of Toyotomi Hideyoshi pursued the defeated Akechi clan to Uchidehama and engaged the clan again there. Akechi Mitsuharu led the Akechi, as his cousin, Mitsuhide, died at Yamazaki. Hori Hidemasa led the Toyotomi forces at Uchidehama, and defeated Akechi Mitsuharu.

Uchidehama was near present-day Ōtsu city, Shiga prefecture outside Kyoto.

References

Uchidehama 1582
1582 in Japan
Uchidehama